Wesly Dijs (born 26 September 1995 in Soest, Netherland) is a Dutch long track speed skater. His specialization is the short and middle-long distances (1000 en 1500 meter). He is a member of :nl:Team Reggeborgh since 2018.

Career
In 2015 Dijs became the world champion in the team pursuit junior together with Marcel Bosker and Patrick Roest.

In his senior career, his best performances at the 2020 Dutch Single Distance championships was sixth place in the 1000 meter and a fourth place in 1500 meter. A year later he improved on this and he finished fifth in the 1000 meter and third in the 1500 meter.

Records

Personal records

Tournament overview

 * DQ = Disqualified
 * NC = No classification
 * DNQ = Did not qualify for the final distance
Source:

References

External links
 

1995 births
Living people
Dutch male speed skaters
21st-century Dutch people